220–224 West Bay Street is a historic building in Savannah, Georgia, United States. Located in Savannah's Historic District, the addresses of some of the properties are West Bay Street, above Factors Walk, while others solely utilize the former King Cotton warehouses on River Street. As of February 2022, these are Nourish, Harley-Davidson Motory Cycles, Charleston Hemp Collective and Dub's Public House.

The building was completed in 1821, for "Matthew Johnston and others," making it one of the earliest buildings in the riverfront area. The western end of the building, number 224, was damaged by fire in 1851.

In 1917, the Hecker-Jones-Jewell Milling Company of New York City had an office at number 220.

The International Milling Company was occupying numbers 220 and 222 around 1940.

River Street façade

See also
Buildings in Savannah Historic District

References

West Bay Street 220–224
Commercial buildings completed in 1821
West Bay Street 220–224